Makaki may refer to:
 Makaki (Afghanistan), a refugee camp
 Makaki, Iran, a village